Woodward Road Stone Arch Bridge is a historic stone arch bridge located at East Durham in Greene County, New York. It was constructed about 1887 and is a single span, dry laid limestone bridge with a round arch. It is eight feet wide and a span of seven feet. It spans a tributary of Cornwallsville Creek.

It was built by Jeremiah Cunningham.

It was listed on the National Register of Historic Places in 2009.

See also

List of bridges and tunnels on the National Register of Historic Places in New York
National Register of Historic Places in Greene County, New York

References

Road bridges on the National Register of Historic Places in New York (state)
Bridges completed in 1887
Bridges in Greene County, New York
National Register of Historic Places in Greene County, New York
Stone arch bridges in the United States